The zàng-fǔ organs are functional entities stipulated by traditional Chinese medicine (TCM). They constitute the centrepiece of TCM's general concept of how the human body works. The term zàng refers to the organs considered to be yin in nature – Heart, Liver, Spleen, Lung, Kidney – while fǔ refers to the yang organs – Small Intestine, Large Intestine, Gall Bladder, Urinary Bladder, Stomach and Sānjiaō.

Each zàng is paired with a fǔ, and each pair is assigned to one of the Wǔ Xíng. The zàng-fǔ are also connected to the twelve standard meridians – each yang meridian is attached to a fǔ organ and each yin meridian is attached to a zàng. They are five systems of Heart, Liver, Spleen, Lung, Kidney.

To highlight the fact that the zàng-fǔ are not equivalent to the anatomical organs, their names are often capitalized.

Anatomical organs
To understand the zàng-fǔ it is important to realize that their concept did not primarily develop out of anatomical considerations. The need to describe and systematize the bodily functions was more significant to ancient Chinese physicians than opening up a dead body and seeing what morphological structures there actually were. Thus, the zàng-fǔ are functional entities first and foremost, and only loosely tied to (rudimentary) anatomical assumptions.

Yin/yang and the Five Elements

Each zàng-fǔ organ has a yin and a yang aspect, but overall, the zàng organs are considered to be yin, and the fǔ organs yang.

Since the concept of the zàng-fǔ was developed on the basis of Wǔ Xíng philosophy, they are incorporated into a system of allocation to one of five elemental qualities (i.e., the Five Elements or Five Phases). The zàng-fǔ share their respective element's allocations (e.g., regarding colour, taste, season, emotion etc.) and interact with each other cyclically in the same way the Five Elements do: each zàng organ has one corresponding zàng organ that it enfeebles, and one that it reinforces. 

The correspondence between zàng-fǔ and Five Elements are stipulated as:

 Fire = Heart and Small Intestine (and, secondarily, Sānjiaō [, ‘’Triple Burner‘’] and Pericardium [])
 Earth = Spleen and Stomach
 Metal = Lung and Large Intestine
 Water = Kidney and Bladder
 Wood = Liver and Gallbladder

Details

The zàng organs' essential functions consist in manufacturing and storing qì and blood (and, in the case of the Kidney, essence). The fǔ organs' main purpose is to transmit and digest (传化) substances (like waste, food, etc.).

Zang

Each zàng has a corresponding "orifice" it "opens" into. This means the functional entity of a given zàng includes the corresponding orifice's functions (e.g. blurry vision is primarily seen as a dysfunction of the Liver zàng as the Liver "opens" into the eyes).

In listing the functions of the zàng organs, TCM regularly uses the term "governing" – indicating that the main responsibility of regulating something (e.g. blood, qì, water metabolism etc.) lies with a certain zàng.

Although the zàng are functional entities in the first place, TCM gives vague locations for them – namely, the general area where the anatomical organ of the same name would be found. One could argue that this (or any) positioning of the zàng is irrelevant for the TCM system; there is some relevance, however, in whether a certain zàng would be attributed to the upper, middle or lower jiaō.

Heart

The Heart:
"Stores" the shén ("Aggregate Soul", usually translated as mind), paired with small intestines
Governs xuě (blood) and vessels/meridians
Opens into the tongue
Reflects in facial complexion

Pericardium

Since there are only five zàng organs but six yin channels, the remaining meridian is assigned to the Pericardium. Its concept is closely related to the Heart, and its stipulated main function is to protect the Heart from attacks by Exterior Pathogenic Factors. Like the Heart, the Pericardium governs blood and stores the mind. The Pericardium's corresponding yang channel is assigned to the Sānjiaō ("Triple Burner").

Spleen

The Spleen:
"Stores" the yì (意, Intent)
Governs "transportation and absorption", i.e. the extraction of jīng weī (lit. "essence bits", usually translated with food essence, sometimes also called jīng qì [, essence qi]) – and water – from food and drink, and the successive distribution of it to the other zàng organs.
Is the source of "production and mutual transformation" of qì and xuě (blood)
"Contains" the blood inside the vessels
Opens into the lips (and mouth)
Governs muscles and limbs

Liver

The Liver:
"Stores" blood, and the hun (Ethereal Soul)
Governs "unclogging and deflation" primarily of qì. The free flow of qì in turn will ensure the free flow of emotions, blood, and water.
Opens into the eyes
Governs the tendons
Reflects in the nails

Lung

Metal. Home of the Po (Corporeal Soul), paired with the large intestine.

The function of the Lung is to descend and disperse qi throughout the body.  It receives qi through the breath, and exhales the waste.  The Lung governs the skin and hair and also governs the exterior (one part of immunity).  A properly functioning Lung organ will ensure the skin and hair are of good quality and that the immune system is strong and able to fight disease.  The normal direction of the Lung is downwards, when Lung qi "rebels" it goes upwards, causing coughing and wheezing.  When the Lung is weak, there can be skin conditions such as eczema, thin or brittle hair, and a propensity to catching colds and flu.  The Lung is weakened by dryness and the emotion of grief or sadness.

Kidney

Water. Home of the Zhi (Will), paired with the bladder.

The Kidneys store Essence, govern birth, growth, reproduction and development. They also produce the Marrow which fills the brain and control the bones. The Kidneys are often referred to as the "Root of Life" or the "Root of the Pre-Heaven Qi". Kidneys house the Will Power (Zhi).

Fu

Large intestine

Gall bladder

Urinary bladder

Stomach

Small intestine

Triple Burner

Critique of zang fu in modern medicine

The concept of the zàng-fǔ is based on ancient metaphor and anecdote – the underlying assumptions and theory are not able to be verified or falsified by experiment. Probably because of this, the concept (and TCM as a whole) has been criticized as pseudo science.

See also
Traditional Chinese medicine
Wu Xing

References

Citations

Sources 

  (2006-07-18), "", retrieved 2010-12-16
 Cultural China (2007), "Chinese Medicine : Basic Zang Fu Theory", "Kaleidoscope → Health", retrieved 2010-12-21
 Kaptchuk, T. (2000). "The Web That Has No Weaver: Understanding Chinese Medicine, 2nd ed." Mcgraw-Hill. 
 Oguamanam C. (2006). "International Law and Indigenous Knowledge: Intellectual Property, Plant Biodiversity, and Traditional Medicine" University of Toronto Press
 Agnes Fatrai, Stefan Uhrig (eds.). Chinese Ophthalmology – Acupuncture, Herbal Therapy, Dietary Therapy, Tuina and Qigong. Tipani-Verlag, Wiesbaden 2015, .

External links
The Zang Fu – Information on the functions of the Zang Fu Organs.
Syndrome differentiation according to zang-fu – Chinese medicine diagnosis on organ diseases.

Traditional Chinese medicine